José Julio Rey (born 13 January 1972 in Toledo, Spain) is a Spanish long-distance runner who won the Hamburg Marathon 4 times between 2001 and 2006. He was banned from competition for 2 years after testing positive for mesterolone at the 1999 Rotterdam Marathon.

Achievements

Personal bests
3000 metres - 7:54.40 min (1997)
5000 metres - 13:22.13 min (1998)
10,000 metres - 27:47.33 min (1998)
Half marathon - 1:02:10 hrs (2002)
Marathon - 2:06:52 hrs (2006)

See also
 List of sportspeople sanctioned for doping offences

External links
 

1972 births
Living people
Spanish male long-distance runners
Spanish male marathon runners
Doping cases in athletics
Spanish sportspeople in doping cases
Athletes (track and field) at the 2004 Summer Olympics
Athletes (track and field) at the 2008 Summer Olympics
Olympic athletes of Spain
Sportspeople from Toledo, Spain
World Athletics Championships medalists
European Athletics Championships medalists